David Lalk (born October 31, 1948) is an American politician in the state of Iowa.

Lalk was born in Oelwein, Iowa and is a farmer. A Republican, he served in the Iowa House of Representatives from 2003 to 2007 (18th district).

References

1948 births
Living people
People from Oelwein, Iowa
Farmers from Iowa
Republican Party members of the Iowa House of Representatives